The 2018 NASCAR Xfinity Series was the 37th season of the NASCAR Xfinity Series, a stock car racing series sanctioned by NASCAR in the United States. William Byron won the 2017 championship with JR Motorsports, but moved up to the Monster Energy NASCAR Cup Series. Tyler Reddick, who replaced Byron in the No. 9 JR Motorsports Chevrolet Camaro SS, won the drivers' championship. Stewart-Haas Racing with Biagi-DenBeste won the owners' championship.

This was the third year that the Xfinity Series (and the Truck Series) had a playoff system. For the first time in the three years of the playoffs at that time, Elliott Sadler and Justin Allgaier were not part of the "championship 4" drivers competing for the title at Homestead. Both drivers did qualify for the postseason but did not advance to the last round of the playoffs as they had done the past two years.

The 2018 season was the first to feature the Regular Season Championship trophy, which is awarded at the final race before the playoffs. Justin Allgaier clinched the NXS Regular Season Championship trophy after the 2018 DC Solar 300 at Las Vegas Motor Speedway.

This was the final season of the Toyota Camry in the Xfinity Series, as it was replaced by the Supra in the 2019 season. It was also the final season of Dodge as a manufacturer, as the new flange-fit composite body rules have made the former Team Penske Challengers (nicknamed "Zombie Dodges" due to their lack of factory support since 2013) used by smaller teams ineligible due to their welded steel bodies.

Teams and drivers

Complete schedule

Limited schedule

Notes

Changes

Teams
 On October 23, 2017, it was announced that Biagi-DenBeste Racing would end their partnership with Richard Petty Motorsports and create a new alliance with Stewart-Haas Racing. The team was then called Stewart-Haas Racing with Biagi-DenBeste Racing. The team fielded 2 teams. Cole Custer drove the No. 00 Ford Mustang GT full-time for a second consecutive season. The No. 41 team was renumbered as the No. 98 team and ran part-time with Kevin Harvick, Chase Briscoe, and Aric Almirola. In 2017, Biagi-DenBeste Racing fielded the No. 98 Ford, running part-time with drivers Aric Almirola, Casey Mears, and Darrell Wallace Jr.
 With their switch from Toyota to Ford, it was also announced that JGL Racing would have a technical alliance with Roush Fenway Racing.
 Richard Childress Racing shut down two teams: the No. 33 and the No. 62.
 Precision Performance Motorsports shut down its No. 46 team to move to the Continental Tire SportsCar Challenge.
 JGL Racing reopened the No. 28 entry for at least 21 races for Dylan Lupton, after shutting down this car at the end of 2017 because of a lack of sponsorship (with Dakoda Armstrong). They also tried to expand the schedule to the full season.
 Go Green Racing returned to the Xfinity Series full-time, fielding the No. 35 entry with Joey Gase as their driver. This was Go Green's first season in the Xfinity Series since 2013 and their first in NASCAR following their merger with FAS Lane Racing to create Go Fas Racing on December 2013.
 JD Motorsports announced a fourth full-time ride, the No. 15 entry initially to be split by veteran drivers including Joe Nemechek and Reed Sorenson. However, this plan was cancelled because Matt Mills was expected to drive the No. 15 car full-time, except the inaugural Daytona race, which had Nemechek behind the wheel.
 JP Motorsports purchased cars from TriStar Motorsports and announced their intentions to run a full season in the No. 55 Toyota Camry on January 18, 2018. At the time of the announcement, Jason Houghtaling was named as crew chief but other information like drivers and sponsors was not immediately released, however Stephen Leicht was later revealed as the full-time driver. On February 5, it was announced that they had acquired an additional Joe Gibbs Racing chassis and would field another full-time team, the No. 45, with Josh Bilicki as the driver.
B. J. McLeod Motorsports announced that the partnership with SS-Green Light Racing to field the No. 99 full-time was finished. As a consequence, the No. 99 car would likely return to part-time racing.
NextGen Motorsports increased their 2018 schedule as they would fielding for multiple drivers. The car number is TBA, due to JP Motorsports taking their No. 55.
 DGM Racing announced that Alex Labbé would drive the full Season in 2018 with a Chevrolet. The car was built by Richard Childress Racing and prepared by King Autosport. Former driver in King Autosport Mario Gosselin will be his crew chief. Alex Labbé was the 2017 NASCAR Pinty's Series champion with the No. 32 car for Go Fas Racing.
 New team NXT Motorsports announced that Gray Gaulding will drive the season-opener at Daytona with a Toyota. The team has acquired cars from Joe Gibbs Racing.
RSS Racing used three cars in the season-opener: The No. 38 for Jeff Green, No. 39 for J. J. Yeley and No. 93 for owner Ryan Sieg without start-and-park for any of them. It looks that the team will use these three cars full-time in 2018. Last year, Sieg drove the No. 39 Chevrolet full-time, while the Nos. 38 and 93 were a part-time start-and-park team, driven by Green, Gray Gaulding and Stephen Leicht.

Drivers
On April 25, 2017, it was announced Dale Earnhardt Jr. would retire from full-time driving in the Monster Energy NASCAR Cup Series (MENCS), but also announced he intends to participate in two races for JR Motorsports in the Xfinity Series. He has confirmed the second Richmond race as one of the two races. Chase Elliott will drive the No. 88 in the season-opener at Daytona.
On September 14, 2017, it was announced that Tyler Reddick would be driving full-time for JR Motorsports in 2018, driving the No. 9 Chevrolet Camaro SS. He replaces William Byron who will be driving the No. 24 Hendrick Motorsports Chevrolet in the MENCS. In 2017, Reddick drove the No. 42 Chevrolet part-time for Chip Ganassi Racing, sharing the ride with Kyle Larson, Justin Marks, and Alex Bowman.
On October 5, 2017, it was announced that Matt Tifft would be leaving Joe Gibbs Racing at the end of 2017, and joining Richard Childress Racing in 2018 to drive the No. 2 Chevrolet. In 2017, Tifft drove the No. 19 Toyota Camry for Joe Gibbs Racing.
On October 13, 2017, it was announced that Christopher Bell would drive full-time for Joe Gibbs Racing in 2018, driving the No. 20 Toyota. Bell will also be competing for Rookie of the Year Honors. In 2017, Bell drove the No. 4 Toyota Tundra full-time for Kyle Busch Motorsports in the NASCAR Camping World Truck Series, winning the championship in the process, and part-time for Joe Gibbs Racing in the Xfinity Series, driving the No. 18 & No. 20 Toyotas.
On October 19, 2017, it was announced that Spencer Boyd would drive full-time in 2018 for SS-Green Light Racing in a renumbered No. 76 car, crew chief Jason Miller and sponsorship from Grunt Style. In 2017, Boyd ran part-time in SS-Green Light's No. 07 entry and part-time in the NASCAR Camping World Truck Series for several teams.
In October 2017, it was announced that Joey Gase will not return to Jimmy Means Racing. Gase will explore more opportunities in the Cup Series.
On November 15, 2017, it was announced that Brandon Jones would be joining Joe Gibbs Racing to drive the No. 19 Toyota, replacing Matt Tifft. In 2017, Jones drove the No. 33 Chevrolet for Richard Childress Racing, as well as the No. 99 MDM Motorsports Chevrolet Silverado in the NASCAR Camping World Truck Series.
On November 15, 2017, it was announced that Ryan Preece would be driving the No. 18 Joe Gibbs Racing Toyota in at least 10 races. Preece will share the ride with Monster Energy NASCAR Cup Series drivers Kyle Busch, Denny Hamlin, Erik Jones, and Daniel Suarez. In 2017, Preece drove in the NASCAR Whelen Modified Tour while also making a few starts for JGR, driving the No. 18 & No. 20 Toyotas. Preece won the July 2017 race at Iowa. On February 17, it was announced that Kyle Benjamin, who made 4 starts for Gibbs in 2017, would drive the No. 18 at Atlanta and Iowa in July. On April 13, it was announced that Noah Gragson, who currently drives the No. 18 Toyota Tundra for Kyle Busch Motorsports in the NASCAR Camping World Truck Series, would make his Xfinity Series debut at Richmond in April and will drive the car at Talladega in April and Dover in May. On June 11, it was announced that Riley Herbst who drives the No. 18 Toyota in the ARCA Series for Joe Gibbs would make his debut at Iowa in June.
On November 17, 2017, it was announced that Kaz Grala will drive the No. 24 Ford Mustang GT for JGL Racing in 2018. Grala will also compete for Rookie of the Year Honors. In 2017, Grala drove the No. 33 Chevrolet Silverado for GMS Racing in the NASCAR Camping World Truck Series. However, due to a lack of sponsorship on May 15, 2018, it was announced that Grala announced he had been released by JGL as the team was shutting down its No. 24 car.
On November 20, 2017, it was announced that Roush Fenway Racing would be running the No. 60 Ford full-time in 2018 as a developmental team in cooperation with Ford and Team Penske. Ty Majeski, Chase Briscoe, and Austin Cindric will all drive the No. 60.  Briscoe and Majeski will drive the car for 12 races each and Cindric will drive for 9 races. This will be the first full-time season for the No. 60 team since winning the Championship with Chris Buescher in 2015. In 2017, Majeski drove part-time in the ARCA Racing Series while also making a few starts in the No. 60 for Roush, while Cindric and Briscoe drove full-time in the NASCAR Camping World Truck Series for the now defunct Brad Keselowski Racing, driving the No. 19 and No. 29 Ford F-150 respectively. Briscoe will also drive the No. 98 Ford for Stewart-Haas Racing with Biagi-DenBeste Racing in 5 races at Bristol in April, Talladega in May, Both Charlotte Races, and the fall playoff race at Kansas.
On December 11, 2017, it was announced that John Hunter Nemechek will drive the No. 42 Chevrolet for Chip Ganassi Racing part-time in 2018, sharing the ride with Kyle Larson and Jamie McMurray. In 2017, Nemechek drove the No. 8 NEMCO Motorsports Chevrolet Silverado in the NASCAR Camping World Truck Series.
On January 5, 2018, it was announced that Joey Gase will drive a new No. 35 entry for Go Green Racing full-time in 2018. Gase last drove for Means Racing full-time in the Xfinity Series in 2017, as well as for Premium Motorsports and BK Racing part-time in the Cup Series. His crew chief will be Patrick Donahue, who worked with Gase at BK Racing.
On January 9, 2018, it was announced that Kaulig Racing had released Blake Koch and that Ryan Truex would replace him in the No. 11 Chevrolet. In 2017, Truex raced full-time in the NASCAR Camping World Truck Series, driving the No. 16 Toyota Tundra for Hattori Racing Enterprises. This will be Truex's first full-time season in the Xfinity series after driving part-time for Michael Waltrip Racing in 2010 and 2011, Joe Gibbs Racing in 2011 and 2012, and Biagi-DenBeste Racing in 2015.
On January 16, 2018, it was announced that Jamie McMurray will make his return to the Xfinity Series, in which he had not competed since 2013. He will drive part-time in the No. 42 car for Chip Ganassi Racing with Kyle Larson and John Hunter Nemechek.
On January 24, 2018, it was announced that Shane Lee, Jeb Burton, and Brendan Gaughan would all drive part-time for Richard Childress Racing in 2018, driving the No. 3 Chevrolet. They will share the ride with MENCS drivers Austin Dillon and Ty Dillon. Lee will make his Xfinity series debut at Bristol in April, Burton will make his return at Richmond in April, and Gaughan will drive in the road course races at Mid-Ohio, Road America, and at Charlotte on the new Roval layout. In 2017, Lee drove full-time in the ARCA Racing Series for Cunningham Motorsports, Burton drove a part-time schedule in the Xfinity Series, driving the No. 24 Toyota for JGL Racing, while Gaughan competed full-time in the Xfinity Series, driving the No. 62 Chevrolet for Richard Childress Racing.
On February 2, 2018, it was announced that Matt Mills will drive the No. 15 Chevrolet for JD Motorsports full-time starting at Atlanta. Mills most recently drove part-time for B. J. McLeod Motorsports, NextGen Motorsports, and Martins Motorsports in 2017. However he was released after DNQing at Texas, and again after running Pocono and Michigan. He would end up running the second races at Richmond and Dover with B.J. Mcleod Motorsports.  
On February 7, 2018 Jimmy Means Racing announced that David Starr will drive the No. 52 car full-time.
On February 8, 2018, it was revealed that Austin Cindric would run a full schedule in the Xfinity Series. Cindric will drive for Penske Racing in either the Nos. 12 or 22 in all races in which he does not drive the No. 60 car for Roush Fenway Racing.
On May 2, 2018, NASCAR announced that Spencer Gallagher was issued a substance abuse penalty and was suspended indefinitely. He also lost his playoff eligibility with the suspension. This came just a week after Gallagher scored his first NASCAR win at Talladega. Johnny Sauter was announced as his replacement for Dover and Chase Elliott will drive the car at Charlotte, Pocono, Chicago, Daytona, and Bristol and Alex Bowman will drive the car at Michigan . Justin Haley, who drives the No. 24 Chevrolet Silverado in the NASCAR Camping World Truck Series for GMS Racing, drove the No. 23 at Iowa in June, and will also a drive a 2nd GMS Car at Daytona in July and Watkins Glen. On July 4, 2018, Gallagher was reinstated and returned to the No. 23 car at Kentucky. On October 19, 2018, Gallagher announced his retirement from racing at the end of the season. He will take on a more managerial role in GMS racing starting in 2019.
On May 7, 2018, it was announced that IndyCar Series driver Conor Daly will make his Xfinity Series debut at Road America driving the No. 6 Roush Fenway Racing Ford.
On August 15, 2018, Elliott Sadler announced his retirement at the end of 2018. His replacement for 2019 onwards is Noah Gragson.

Crew chiefs
Brian Wilson will take over the Crew Chief duties for the No. 22 Team Penske Ford Mustang GT after it was announced that Greg Erwin would be moving up to the Monster Energy NASCAR Cup Series to be Paul Menard's crew chief at Wood Brothers Racing.
Jason Ratcliff will move over from the No. 20 MENCS team to the No. 20 Xfinity Series team to be the crew chief for Christopher Bell. Chris Gabehardt, who was the previous crew chief for the No. 20, will move over to the No. 19 team to be Brandon Jones' crew chief, replacing Matt Beckham.
Chad Norris will take over as Crew Chief at GMS Racing for the No. 23 for Spencer Gallagher. Norris was the Crew Chief for Brennan Poole in the No. 48 at Chip Ganassi Racing in 2017.
Shane Wilson will take over as Crew Chief at JGL Racing for the No. 24 for Kaz Grala. Wilson was the Crew Chief for Brendan Gaughan in the No. 62 at Richard Childress Racing in 2017.
Jason Houghtaling will move from MBM Motorsports to JP Motorsports to crew chief the startup team's No. 55 entry.

Manufacturers

JGL Racing would switch from Toyota to Ford this season. JGL Racing had been running Toyota cars from 2015 to 2017.
This was the final season of the Toyota Camry, which was replaced by the Supra in 2019.
This was also the final season of Dodge as a manufacturer. In the 2013 season, Dodge stopped factory support after Penske Racing switched to Ford because of this, the former Penske Challengers used by smaller teams were nicknamed "Zombie Dodges". The new flange-fit composite body rules have made the welded steel-bodied Challengers ineligible to compete in 2019.

Rule changes
On July 31, 2017, NASCAR announced that drivers with more than five years of full-time racing on the Monster Energy NASCAR Cup level and registered as Monster Energy NASCAR Cup drivers for the 2018 season for points purposes may drive a maximum of seven Xfinity Series races. In addition, all full-time registered Monster Energy NASCAR Cup Series drivers were ineligible to drive in the Dash 4 Cash races as well as the final eight races of the season (the final race before the playoffs and the playoffs).  Drivers who have declared eligibility for Xfinity Series points, regardless of Cup experience, can compete in those races.
On November 1, 2017, NASCAR announced a series of Xfinity Series rule changes for 2018.
 The 7/8 inch restrictor plate and aero ducts used at the Indianapolis Motor Speedway for the Lilly Diabetes 250 will also be used at Pocono and Michigan.
 Teams may use the flange-fit composite body at 30 races—all except Daytona and Talladega.
 Teams must use a NASCAR-specification flat splitter.
 Teams must use a specification radiator.
 Brake cooling hoses and fans will be reduced.
 Teams must use a single transmission for the entire race meeting, however, this rule does not apply at the road course races. The standard splitter height is four inches.
 The "black box" will be powered by the vehicle, not separate batteries.
 As part of an investigation into the 2015 Alert Today Florida 300 Xfinity race crash that injured Kyle Busch, NASCAR imposed new chassis specifications (Enhanced Vehicle Chassis) for safety reasons that will be implemented in two phases.
 Starting with the conclusion of the 2017 Monster Energy NASCAR Cup Series season, all new chassis must be certified to the new specification.
 Currently constructed and certified chassis that had been certified as of the 2017 Ford EcoBoost 300 will have a one-year grace period until they must be certified.
Starting from this season, drivers that declared eligibility to the Xfinity Series will have their last name featured in the front windshield of the car, with the Xfinity logo being reduced into two smaller logos in the upper corner area of the front windshield between the driver's name. Those who didn't declared eligibility to the series will only feature the Xfinity logo in the front windshield of their car.

Schedule

The final schedule – comprising 33 races – was released on May 23, 2017. Key changes from 2017 include:

The PowerShares QQQ 300 was held one week earlier. As a result of this, all races from Atlanta until Talladega (spring), moved one week earlier than 2017.
The ToyotaCare 250 at Richmond Raceway moved from Saturday afternoon to Friday night due to attendance issues.
The OneMain Financial 200 moved between Talladega and Charlotte. Due to Daytona moving a week earlier, Dover was forced to move to May, similar to 2016.
The new date that Las Vegas Motor Speedway acquired from Kentucky Speedway was moved to the final race of the regular season to replace Overton's 300 at Chicagoland Speedway which move back to July before the Coca-Cola Firecracker 250. That means the Coca-Cola Firecracker 250, Alsco 300 and Lakes Region 200 will move one week earlier than 2017.
The Lilly Diabetes 250 at Indianapolis Motor Speedway moved to September between Darlington and Las Vegas.
The Drive for the Cure 200 at Charlotte Motor Speedway moved one week earlier to become the second race of the Round of 12 and will utilize the track's road course layout instead of its quad-oval. That means the Bar Harbor 200 at Dover International Speedway moved one week later to become the elimination race of the Round of 12.

Schedule changes
In 2015, NASCAR and 24 Xfinity Series tracks agreed on a five-year contract that guarantees each track would continue to host races through 2020. Despite the agreement, Speedway Motorsports decided to transfer one of its Xfinity Series races at Kentucky Speedway to Las Vegas Motor Speedway to form a race weekend involving each of the three national series in the fall. With the official release of the schedule, NASCAR announced that the race Las Vegas Motor Speedway acquired from Kentucky Speedway will become the final race before the Xfinity Series playoffs, while the Go Bowling 250 at Richmond Raceway will be held as the first race of the playoffs. Furthermore, the Lilly Diabetes 250 at Indianapolis Motor Speedway will move from July to September. Chicagoland Speedway's race, the Overton's 300, will move from September to June to become the 15th race of the season instead of the 26th.

A few other minor schedule changes were also announced with the release of the schedule. Unlike the 2017 season, the OneMain Financial 200 at Dover International Speedway will precede the Alsco 300 at Charlotte Motor Speedway, while the Bar Harbor 200, also at Dover International Speedway, will move one week later to follow the Drive for the Cure 200 at Charlotte Motor Speedway. The Drive for the Cure 200 will also utilize Charlotte Motor Speedway's  road course instead of its oval. Road America will also move back to a Saturday afternoon.

On August 25, NASCAR announced the tracks that will compose the Dash 4 Cash incentive program: The four Dash 4 Cash races will be run consecutively on the overall series schedule, starting at Bristol Motor Speedway on April 14. From there, the bonus program rolls on to Richmond Raceway (April 20) and Talladega (April 28) before concluding at Dover International Speedway on May 5. Drivers eligible for driver championship points in the Monster Energy NASCAR Cup Series are ineligible to participate in either Dash 4 Cash, the second Las Vegas race, or the playoff races.  Drivers such as Elliott Sadler (13 years) and Dale Earnhardt Jr. (18 years), who are expected to register as Xfinity drivers, will be eligible since they are registering as Xfinity drivers.

Results and standings

Race results

Drivers' Championship

(key) Bold – Pole position awarded by time. Italics – Pole position set by final practice results or owner's points. * – Most laps led. 1 – Stage 1 winner. 2 – Stage 2 winner. 1–10 – Regular season top 10 finishers.
. – Eliminated after Round of 12
. – Eliminated after Round of 8

Owners' championship (Top 15)
(key) Bold - Pole position awarded by time. Italics - Pole position set by final practice results or rainout. * – Most laps led. 1 – Stage 1 winner. 2 – Stage 2 winner. 1–10 – Owners' regular season top 10 finishers.
. – Eliminated after Round of 12
. – Eliminated after Round of 8

Manufacturers' Championship

See also

2018 Monster Energy NASCAR Cup Series
2018 NASCAR Camping World Truck Series
2018 NASCAR K&N Pro Series East
2018 NASCAR K&N Pro Series West
2018 NASCAR Whelen Modified Tour
2018 NASCAR Pinty's Series
2018 NASCAR PEAK Mexico Series
2018 NASCAR Whelen Euro Series

References

NASCAR Xfinity Series seasons